Hong Eui-jeong (born 1982) is a South Korean film director, screenwriter and producer. She has won the Blue Dragon Film Awards for Best New Director, Best New Director at the Asian Film Awards, Buil Film Awards and Korean Association of Film Critics Awards, and Best Director at the Baeksang Arts Awards for her feature directorial debut in indie crime drama film Voice of Silence (2020).

Career
Born in 1982, Hong Eui-jeong grew up in a remote rural area of Chungcheong Province, South Korea. She graduated from the Korea National University of Arts in visual design in 2005. She spent around 2 years serving as camera operator, cinematographer, producer and assistant director for commercials and music videos before studying at the London Film School. After she graduated as a cinematographer in 2011, she stayed and worked in London for a few more years, making several short films and commercials. Working as a director of photography in short Hot & Bothered, the film won Best Shorts at BBC's Creative Climate Short Film Competition Award of Excellence in 2012.

In 2016, Hong wrote and directed sci-fi short film Better Than Tomorrow. The film, which portrays a man searching for his wife in a mysterious rehabilitation facility after being frozen for many years, won Best Student Film at London Short Film Festival. That same year, her screenplay Without a Sound was selected as one of the top 12 projects at Venice Biennale Collage-Cinema 2016/2017, and shortlisted for Sundance Screenwriters Lab with working title Without a Trace. The following year, Hong and BAFTA winning producer Afolabi Kuti developed the screenplay to a feature film. She next released her short Habitat. A story which is set in the near future where South and North Korea have been reunified, the film was premiered at the 2018 Busan International Film Festival.

In 2020 Hong released her feature debut Voice of Silence, which was based on the screenplay Without a Sound, starring Yoo Ah-in and Yoo Jae-myung. It tells a story of two clean-up crew for a crime organization who receive an order to take care of an eleven-year-old kidnapped girl. Prior to the release, the film was screened at the Cannes International Film Festival's virtual market Marché du Film in June 2020. It was also screened at various film festivals, such as the Glasgow Film Festival, Fantasy Filmfest, Far East Film Festival, Brussels International Fantastic Film Festival, and Transilvania International Film Festival in 2021. The film was critically acclaimed. Rouven Linnarz from Asian Movie Pulse wrote, "Hong Eui-jeong has created an ambitious piece of work, whose cast and aesthetics are just two aspects within a story that offers a rich, but also grim social subtext". Nikki Baughan from Screen International called it, "a remarkable first feature from a talented new director who, one hopes, is only just beginning to find her own voice", and "a beautifully executed thriller which would be an impressive piece of work for any filmmaker, let alone one making her feature debut". Jennie Kermode of Eye of Film was similarly positive and wrote, "Hong Eui-jeong directs with such assurance and such flair that it's hard to believe this is her first feature", and concluded, "Voice Of Silence will horrify you, charm you, make you laugh, thrill you and leave you on the brink of tears. This is the kind of work that cinema was invented for." Nick Allen of Roger Ebert wrote in his Fantasia review, "[...] an impressive feat far more nuanced than Hollywood would ever dare without making it a jokey affair", and "[...] Hong is confident, and wholly trusting the audience does not see black and white".

For her first feature film Voice of Silence, Hong earned Best New Director at the 41st Blue Dragon Film Awards and Best Director at the 57th Baeksang Arts Awards, respectively. She also won Best New Director awards at the 30th Buil Film Awards, 15th Asian Film Awards, and 41st Korean Association of Film Critics Awards, and the film won Cheval Noir Award for Best Feature (Best Film) at the 2021 Fantasia International Film Festival.

Filmography

Film

Commercial and music video
 It's Rising Again, Music Video, UK 2013 (writer/director) 
 Step Back (Ofgem Series), Online Commercial, UK 2015 (director)

Awards and nominations

References

External links
 
 
 EuiJeong Hong at Website

1982 births
Living people
South Korean film directors
South Korean screenwriters
South Korean women film directors
Women screenwriters
South Korean film producers
South Korean women film producers
Korea National University of Arts alumni
Alumni of the London Film School
Best Director Paeksang Arts Award (film) winners